Spinacanthus cuneiformis is an extinct prehistoric tetraodontid bony fish that lived from the Lutetian epoch of Eocene Monte Bolca.

In life, it would have resembled a somewhat-flattened boxfish with five long spines along the anterior-dorsal side, with the longest spine directly above the forehead, and the shortest spine directly in front of the dorsal fin.  It is distinguished from its close, sympatric relative, Protobalistum, in that its individual scales are relatively small, and do not touch each other.  (In Protobalistum, the scales are large, and form a sort of armor).

S. cuneiformis and Protobalistum were a part of the ecosystem of the lagoon that became Monte Bolca.  Because of their similarity to boxfish, and due to their close relation to modern-day triggerfish, spinacanthids may have preyed on shellfish and small fish.

See also

 Prehistoric fish
 List of prehistoric bony fish
 Protobalistum, its closest relative
 Eospinus, another close relative from the Earliest Eocene of Turkmenistan
 Eolactoria, another extinct tetraodontid from Monte Bolca
 Proaracana, another extinct tetraodontid from Monte Bolca

References

A remarkable new genus of Tetraodontiform fish with features of both Balistids and Ostraciids from the Eocene of Turkmenistan (contains a brief discussion and description of Spinacanthidae)

Spinacanthidae
Fossils of Italy
Fossil taxa described in 1835